MIM or Mim may refer to:

Places 
 Mim, Ahafo, Ghana
 Mim Lake, Ghana
 Mim Bour, or Mim Mountains, Ghana

Education
 Master of Management, a post-graduate master's degree
 Master of Information Management, an interdisciplinary degree program

Organizations
 Berlin Musical Instrument Museum, a museum in Germany
 Mim Museum, a museum in Beirut, Lebanon
 Musical Instrument Museum (Brussels), a museum in Belgium
 Musical Instrument Museum (Phoenix), a museum in Arizona, US
 Morality in Media Inc., now known as the National Center on Sexual Exploitation in U.S.
 Mount Isa Mines, an Australian mining company
 MIM Holdings Limited, its former parent company
 MIM – Laboratoire Musique et Informatique de Marseille

Political parties
 All India Majlis-e-Ittehadul Muslimeen, a Muslim political party in India
 Maoist Internationalist Movement, a former communist group based primarily in the U.S.
 Martinican Independence Movement, a political party in Martinique
 Muslim Independence Movement, later Mindanao Independence Movement, a short-lasting movement in the Philippines

People
 Mim (vocalist), stage name of English adult contemporary music vocalist Miriam Grey
 Mim Bidya Sinha Saha, Bangladeshi actress
 Mim Scala (born 1940), theatrical agent

Fictional characters
 Madam Mim, a witch in the novel The Sword in the Stone and film
 Mîm, a dwarf in the legendarium of J.R.R. Tolkien
 Mímir or Mim, a figure in Norse mythology
 Shinji Mimura, a character from Battle Royale, nicknamed "Mim" in the manga adaptation

Science and technology
 Mendelian Inheritance in Man, a database that catalogues all the known diseases with a genetic component
 Molecular Interaction Maps, a graphic formalism to depict cellular and molecular interactions
 .MIM (.mim), file extension, or .MIME or .mime identifying a MIME-encoded file
 Metal injection molding, a manufacturing process
 Metal-insulator-metal, a type of diode
 Microsoft Identity Manager, version of Microsoft Identity Integration Server
 Mobile Interceptor Missile such as MIM-3 Nike Ajax

Transport
 MIM, IATA airport code for Merimbula Airport, Australia
 MIM, National Rail code for Moreton-in-Marsh railway station, UK

Language
 Mem, also spelled Mim, the thirteenth letter of many Semitic abjads, including Phoenician, Aramaic, Hebrew and Arabic
 mim, ISO 639 code for Silacayoapan Mixtec, spoken in southern Mexico

See also
 
 
 Mime (disambiguation)